Gardoqui is a wealthy Spanish family. A renowned member of this family was Don Diego de Gardoqui Arriquibar who was the first Ambassador of Spain to the United States and Spanish Finance Minister.]

Gardoqui Family of Bilbao, Spain
Wealthy Basque proprietors of the 18th-Century House of José Gardoqui and Sons (la Casa de José Gardoqui e hijos) of Bilbao, Spain.

The most famous member of this family was Don Diego de Gardoqui Arriquibar (1735-1798), who was the first Ambassador of Spain to the United States and Spanish Finance Minister in 1792, after the death of Don Pedro López de Lerena, Count of Lerena.

Spain made loans to the United States to be used to furnish war supplies through the House of Gardoqui, which "supplied the patriots with 215 bronze cannon - 30,000 muskets - 30,000 bayonets - 51,314 musket balls - 300,000 pounds of powder - 12,868 grenades - 30,000 uniforms - and 4,000 field tents during the war."

There was a Catholic Cardinal in the family: Francisco Antonio Javier de Gardoqui Arriquíbar (1747-1820).

See also
Spain in the American Revolutionary War

References

External links
 Current Exhibit at the Smithsonian Institution's National Portrait Gallery Legacy: Spain and the United States in the Age of Independence, 1763-1848 (from September 27, 2007 to February 10, 2008).

Basque history